Yuliya Kalina (born October 24, 1988) is a Ukrainian weightlifter. She competed at the 2012 Summer Olympics in the women's 58 kg.

Career
Kalina started weightlifting at the age of 12. At 13 she joined Ukraine's junior weightlifting team. 2 years later Kalina became a single parent with one daughter, Myroslava (born in 2003). Myroslava lives with her grandmother in Mariupol, while her mother resides in Kyiv.

On 13 July 2016, IOC announced that Yuliya Kalina has been disqualified from the 2012 Summer Olympics and ordered to return the bronze medal from the 58 kg weightlifting event. Reanalysis of Kalina's samples from London 2012 resulted in a positive test for the prohibited substance dehydrochlormethyltestosterone (turinabol). She has been disqualified for two years until 10 June 2018.

Since 1 May 2017, she is married to Ukrainian weightlifter Ihor Shymechko.

References

Ukrainian female weightlifters
1988 births
Sportspeople from Mariupol
Living people
Olympic weightlifters of Ukraine
Weightlifters at the 2012 Summer Olympics
Ukrainian sportspeople in doping cases
Doping cases in weightlifting
Competitors stripped of Summer Olympics medals
European Weightlifting Championships medalists
World Weightlifting Championships medalists
21st-century Ukrainian women